Toby Swift is a radio drama director and producer for BBC Radio.  His numerous credits, from 1999 to 2011, include the crime dramas The Recall Man and Trueman and Riley.  He also directs contemporary and periodic radio dramas.

He won the Prix Italia for Adapted Drama in 2004 for M, and again in 2005 for My Arm and for a third time in 2007 for Metropolis.  The Loop won a Bronze Sony Radio Academy Award for Best Drama Production in 2010.

Radio plays

Notes:

Sources:
 Toby Swift's radio play listing at Diversity website
 Toby Swift's radio play listing at RadioListings website

References

BBC Radio drama directors
BBC radio producers
Living people
Prix Italia winners
Year of birth missing (living people)